The 6N14P (Russian: 6Н14П) is a miniature Russian-made medium gain dual triode vacuum tube, intended for service as a low-noise cascode amplifier at HF through VHF frequencies.  It is a direct equivalent of ECC84 and 6CW7 vacuum tubes.

Basic data 

Uf = 6.3V, If = 350 mA uM = 25 Ia = 10.5 mA S = 6.8 mA/V Pa = 1.5 W

History of Use 

In the Soviet Union 6N14P found application in special equipment and to a lesser extent in more-expensive FM receivers and television sets in the 1960s.  However, in the majority of medium and low-grade Soviet-produced FM radios a more general purpose 6N3P (2C51) vacuum tube was utilized, as the lower frequency OIRT FM band used in the USSR (65.8 to 74 MHz) allowed for less stringent noise figure requirements towards the receiver design and its components than the higher frequency Western FM broadcast band (87.5-108 MHz) used in most of the rest of the world.

Currently, like many other vacuum tubes, 6N14P has found some use with DIY audio enthusiasts.

See also 
6N3P
6DJ8
6N24P

External links 
6N14P tube datasheet
ECC84 tube datasheet
ECC84 at the National Valve Museum

Vacuum tubes